Five Pointe O (pronounced "5 point O") was a nu metal band from Joliet, Illinois.

History
Five Pointe 0 was formed in 1999 by vocalist Daniel Struble, guitarist Sharon Grzelinski and bassist Sean Pavey. They then recruited Eric Wood on guitar, Tony Starcevich on drums and Casey Mejia on keyboards. The band self-released two EPs in 1999, Five Pointe 0 and The Other Side.

In 2001, they signed with Roadrunner Records and released their debut album Untitled on March 19, 2002. After almost a full year of touring, vocalist Daniel Struble and guitarist Sharon Grzelinski parted ways with the band. Despite the remaining members vowing to continue on, the band later disbanded.

The song "The Infinity" was featured in the film, Resident Evil.

Members
 Daniel Struble – vocals
 Eric Wood  – guitar
 Sharon Grzelinski – guitar
 Jon Bartlett – guitar
 Sean Pavey – bass
 Tony Starcevich – drum
 Casey Mejia – keyboard

Discography

 - Re-recorded for Untitled

References

External links
 
 

American nu metal musical groups
Musical groups established in 1999
Musical groups disestablished in 2003
Musical groups from Chicago
Rap metal musical groups
Roadrunner Records artists
1999 establishments in Illinois